Boon is a railway point and unincorporated place in geographic Templeton Township, Algoma District in Northeastern Ontario, Canada. It is counted as part of Unorganized Algoma North Part in Canadian census data.

Boon is on the Algoma Central Railway, between the communities of Hale to the south and Horsey to the north.

References

Other map sources:

Communities in Algoma District